Pennsylvania Avenue Line can refer to the following transit lines:
Pennsylvania Avenue Line (Baltimore), Maryland, United States, now the Route 7 bus
Pennsylvania Avenue Line (Washington, D.C.), United States, now the Route 30 bus

See also
Pennsylvania Line (disambiguation)